Regents is an American punk rock band formed in 2007 by former Sleepytime Trio and Maximillian Colby guitar/vocalists Drew Ringo and David NeSmith and drummer Jason Hamacher of Frodus. Originally a keytar and drum duo called Regions, the pair recruited NeSmith's Sleepytime Trio and Maximillian Colby bandmate Drew Ringo, as well as former The Exploder bassist Dan Evans and begun playing under the name Regents.

In 2012, they played a show at SXSW. The group has gotten many positive reviews for their shows.

Discography
 Regents (2011 Lovitt Records)
 Antietam After Party (2012 Lovitt Records)

References

External links 
 Lovitt Records

American punk rock groups
American post-hardcore musical groups
Musical groups from Washington, D.C.